The Government Medical College, Thiruvananthapuram (also known as Thiruvananthapuram Medical College or Trivandrum Medical College) is in Thiruvananthapuram (the capital of Kerala), India. Founded in 1951, it was inaugurated by Prime Minister Jawaharlal Nehru and is Kerala's first ever Medical College. 

Its campus houses several hospitals and institutions in addition to Medical College Hospital (MCH), including the Colleges of Nursing and Pharmaceutical sciences, the Regional Cancer Centre; an autonomous institution under Central Government, Thiruvananthapuram Dental College, Sree Chitra Tirunal Institute for Medical Sciences and Technology; another autonomous institute under Govt of India, the Priyadarshini Institute of Paramedical Sciences, the Sree Avittom Thirunal Hospital for Women and Children (SAT Hospital), where the highest number of deliveries are reported in Asia, Child development centre (CDC) an autonomous institution under state government and the Multidisciplinary Research Laboratory (MDRL). The Regional Institute of Ophthalmology (RIO), also a part of the college, is being upgraded to a national-level independent institute.

Location 
The  campus and hospital campus are west of Dr. C. O. Karunakaran Avenue (formerly the Kumarapuram-Ulloor Road). Across from the hospital is the Chalakuzhi road, which meets the NH544 near Pattom.

History

1948–1980 
The history of Medical College starts with construction of Sree Avittom Thirunal hospital for women and children by Travancore Royal Family.Avittom Thirunal was the crown prince of Travancore .His death due rheumatic heart disease lead then Maharaja Sree Padmanabha dasa chithira thirunal balarama verma to construct this unique  first few of its kind in India.
In 1948, the government of Travancore appointed a committee to formulate proposals for a medical college at Thiruvananthapuram. The committee submitted its report and the scheme was sanctioned in October of that year. C. O. Karunakaran was appointed Special Officer for the implementation of the scheme, and was the college's first dean.

Its layout and architectural designs were prepared by J. A. Ritchie of Bombay. The college and hospital buildings were separated by playgrounds for football and hockey, a cricket pitch, courts for tennis, basketball, badminton and volleyball, and a 400-meter track.

The foundation stone was laid by Raja Pramukh of Travancore–Cochin (Sree Padmanabhadasa Vanchipala Chithira thirunal Balarama Verma ) at 11:45 am on 26 January 1950, and the first group of students was admitted in August 1951. The college was dedicated by Jawaharlal Nehru at 8:00 am on 27 November 1951 in the presence of Sree Chithira Thirunal. In January 1952, the Sri. Avittom Thirunal Hospital (SATH) was dedicated by Rajkumari Amrit Kaur. A men's hostel opened in 1952, followed by a women's Hostel one year later. The Medical College Hospital was dedicated by Prime Minister Nehru in 1954.

The School of Nursing was dedicated by Sethu Lakshmi Bai in 1954, and was upgraded to a college of nursing in 1963. The cancer wing was dedicated in 1958; after two decades, the Regional Cancer Centre was founded. The dentistry course and the first post-graduate course began in 1959.

The library was established during the 1960s. The limb center and mental and ophthalmic hospitals were brought into the college. During the 1990s the Regional Institute of Ophthalmology was founded. The Sree Chitra Thirunal Centre, the College of Pharmaceutical Sciences and the Priya Darshini Institute of Paramedical Sciences were established, and the Silver Jubilee Auditorium was built.

1981 to present 
A specialty block, housing the college's medical and surgical specialties, became operational on 1 July 2010. The block was funded by the prime minister's Swasthya Suraksha Yojna scheme and by the Kerala government. The 253-bed,  specialty block houses the outpatient clinics and inpatient wards of six specialties, eight operating theatres, six 29-bed intensive-care units and dialysis and kidney-transplant units.

It is financed and administrated by the Health and Family welfare Department of the government of Kerala. Although the college was initially affiliated with the University of Kerala, since 2010 it has been affiliated with the Kerala University of Health Sciences.

Departments 
The college began with departments of anatomy, physiology, biochemistry and bacteriology. Dr. C. O. Karunakaran was the first principal of the college. The departments were headed by V. Mathew, C. Vareed, Narayana Rao and C. O. Karunakaran, respectively. The department of bacteriology initially consisted of microbiology, pathology and hygiene. During the Asian flu epidemic, the department was in the forefront of isolating the influenza virus under R. Ananthanarayanan. In 1981, an AIDS surveillance center was established in the department. The Department of Community Medicine, established in 1953, was the first of its kind in India. A primary health centre for field training was established in July 1953 in Cheruvikkal, which was moved to Pangappara in 1964. Intern training was initially conducted at the Indo-Norwegian MCH unit in Neendakara. The department has a regional cell for the prevention of epidemic and infectious diseases. Forensic medicine which was part of community medicine, became a separate entity in 1966 under V. Kanthasamy. Medico-legal autopsies have been performed since 1955, and the department became a state medico-legal institute in 1986. The department of pharmacology later established an experimental pharmacology wing.

The clinical departments of medicine and surgery and the college hospital were established in 1952. Students were initially trained at the general hospital in Thiruvananthapuram. A department of infectious diseases was established in 1983. R. Kesavan Nair, chief surgeon at the general hospital, was appointed professor of surgery and the department of surgery was established. Recognizing the importance of the new specialty of orthopedic surgery, the government of Travancore sent K. I. George of the health services department to the UK for advanced training. George joined the college in 1956, and founded Kerala's first department of orthopedics.

The department of pediatrics, initially under general medicine, has the highest number of patients in Kerala. The obstetrics and gynecology department began in 1954 and was later added to the family-planning clinic contraception testing unit, the WHO training center and the infertility clinic. The department of physical medicine and rehabilitation, established in 1968, pioneered disability management and the treatment of occupational diseases in India.

Specialty departments were established in 1965 with neurosurgery under M. Sambasivan, former president of the World Federation of Neurosurgical Societies. The department of cardiology was established in 1972, and nephrology in 1981. Medical and surgical gastroenterology units were established in 1972 and 1975, respectively.

Institutions and units

Medical college 
In addition to an MBBS programme, postgraduate degree and diploma courses in 22 specialties are offered.

Medical College Hospital 
The Medical College Hospital provides comprehensive health care. It is the largest multi-specialty hospital in South Kerala, serving most of the Thiruvananthapuram and Kollam districts and adjacent districts in Tamil Nadu. The hospital includes a main hospital block, trauma care and an outpatient department. The 3,250-bed hospital admits 80,000 patients a year and provides over 7,500,000 outpatient consultations. The outpatient block houses outpatient wings of medical and surgical specialties, a pharmacy and resident and graduate housing. The hospital averages 55 major and 125 minor operations and 35 vaginal deliveries and 15 caesarean sections per day. Bed occupancy is 90 to 95 percent throughout the year. The new multi-speciality block of medical college hospital will be inaugurated soon to provide better treatment facilities.

Regional Institute of Ophthalmology 
About  from the main campus, the Regional Institute of Ophthalmology is near the general hospital in Thiruvananthapuram. It originated as a government ophthalmic hospital in 1905, and was brought into the National Programme for Control of Blindness in 1995. The RIO is directed by Dr Sahasranamam V. Postgraduate courses in ophthalmology are offered, and a bachelor's-degree course in optometry is available with an annual intake of 20 students. A BSc. Optometry course began in 2010.

RIO is India's second government institute offering a bachelor's degree in optometry. It hosts an optical outlet (in collaboration with HLL Life Care) and a dispensing facility. Specialized services including retina, paediatric ophthalmology, low vision, cornea and glaucoma clinics, an eye bank, tele-ophthalmology, a uvea clinic, a dispensing lab and contact-lens and cataract clinics. Kerala's first mobile eye hospital, Sunayanam, operates from the RIO.

School of Optometry 
The School of Optometry is on the RIO campus. A Bachelor of Science (Honours) degree in optometry is affiliated with Kerala University of Health Sciences. GMC Thiruvananthapuram is India's second government institute offering a four-year professional degree course in optometry; the first is All India Institute of Medical Sciences, Delhi.

Health units 
The first health unit was established in Neendakara as an Indo-Norwegian collaboration. A primary health centre, founded in July 1953 in Cheruvikkal for field practice, was moved to Pangappara in 1964. Rural health centers for student and intern field practice are in Pangappara and Vakkom.

Sree Avittom Thirunal Hospital 
The women's and children's hospital was dedicated in 1952. It was built by the Travancore royal family in memory of Prince Sree Avittom Thirunal, who died at age eight years of rheumatic heart disease. The hospital houses the departments of obstetrics and gynecology and pediatrics. The OB-GYN department administers the postpartum, family-welfare counseling, infertility, trophoblastic, adolescent and vesicular-mole clinics and WHO and Indian Council of Medical Research collaborative study centers. The hospital also provides pediatric care in cardiology, neurology, nephrology, genetics, surgery and psychiatry, and has one of Asia's highest delivery rates.

Specialty block 
The specialty block, dedicated in 2011, houses the nephrology, urology, neurology, neurosurgery and medical and surgical gastroenterology departments and their out- and inpatient wings, and has 40 ICU beds, 25 high-care beds and six modular operating theaters. Cadaver organ retrieval and transplant began in 2012, making it the first government hospital to offer the service on a wide scale.

Biomedical engineering department 
A team of biomedical engineers and technicians is available at the hospital to maintain its equipment.

Child-development centre 
The Child Development Centre was established by the government of Kerala for early-child and adolescent care and education, premarital counselling, women's welfare and related fields. It has contributed to reducing childhood disabilities and developed the Thiruvananthapuram Development Chart, used to assess child development in community settings.

Mental Health Center 
The Mental Health Center in Oolampara is administered by the college. With more than 150 patients, it is India's second-largest mental health center. In addition to treatment facilities, a rehabilitation center has been established with the aid of Hindustan Latex Limited.

Chest Diseases Hospital 
The former government tuberculosis sanatorium in Pulayanarkottah is now part of the department of respiratory medicine, which is housed here (except for the outpatient department and intensive-care unit, which are at the college). The sanatorium has been renamed the Chest Diseases Hospital.

Dental college 
Thiruvananthapuram Dental College was founded in 1959, one of four dental colleges in India's four southern states. M. Thangavelu, dean of the medical college, was instrumental in organizing the institution. A. M. Clement, a dental surgeon at the medical college, was appointed its first director. The college admits 50 students a year for its BDS course. Postgraduate courses began in 1966. The college has six departments under director N. O. Varghese.

College of Pharmaceutical Sciences 
Established in 1967, Kerala's first pharmaceutical college offers bachelor's and master's degrees and a diploma in pharmaceutical sciences. The college includes departments of pharmacology, pharmaceutics, pharmacognosy, pharmaceutical chemistry and pharmaceutical microbiology. Other facilities are toxicology and animal labs, a drug-information center, morphine-tablet manufacturing and a medicinal

College of Nursing 
The college, founded in 1972, is affiliated with the University of Kerala medical school. It has offered postgraduate programmes in nursing since 1987. The college has five areas of speciality training: mental-health nursing, medical-surgical nursing, pediatric nursing, obstetrical and gynaecological nursing and community-health nursing. Although the number of male students permitted to enroll in the school was originally restricted to 12.5 percent of applicants, the restriction has been removed. A specialised nursing wing opened in 2011.

Regional Artificial Limb Fitting Centre 
The centre, which primarily provides rehabilitation services for amputees, was established in 1975.

Central Library 
The library, housed in the administrative wing, contains books and academic journals relating to medicine and its allied sciences. Its Learning Resource Center (LRC), established by the college's alumni association, has internet-enabled computers for paid use and subscribes to online medical journals

Multidisciplinary Research Laboratory (MDRL) and Animal house
A state of the art platform for motivating medical fraternity and students in multidisciplinary research activities. The center consists of Multidisciplinary research unit (MRU- ICMR), Viral research and diagnostic lab(VRDL-ICMR), Physiology research lab and multichannel data acquisition system, Lecture halls and auditorium. Zebra fish research facility has the fully automated systems, the first installation in Kerala. COVID-19 diagnostic lab is currently functioning here.

Academics 
Courses offered by the college are:
 M.B.B.S. (annual intake 250 students)
 M.D.-M.S. (annual intake about 160 students in 23 disciplines)
 D.M.-M.Ch. (18 seats in four and six disciplines, respectively)
 BSc (Hons.) in Optometry (annual intake 20 students)
 Bachelor of Pharmacy (annual intake 60 students)
 BSc (Hons.) in Nursing (annual intake 60 students)
 BSc (Hons.) in Medical Lab Technology (annual intake 28 students)
 BSc in Perfusion Technology (annual intake four students)
 BSc in Cardiovascular Technology (annual intake five students) 
 BSc in Nursing (post-certificate)
 MSc in Nursing (annual intake 28 students)
 Master of Pharmacy (annual intake 26 students in Five branches)
 Master of Science in Medical Laboratory Technology (annual intake 12 students)
 Master of Science in Medical Physics and Epidemiology (16 seats)
 M.Phil in Clinical Epidemiology (10 seats)
Diploma in CENTRAL STERILE SERVICE DEPARTMENT technology- DCSSDT-course (4 seats )
 Diploma in Medical Laboratory Technology (40 seats in the college)
 Diploma in Radiological Technology (10 seats in the college)
 Diploma in Dialysis Technology (annual intake six students)
 Diploma in General Nursing and Midwifery (annual intake 30 students)
 Diploma in Clinical Child Development (annual intake 12 students)
 Diploma in Pharmacy (20 seats in the college)
 Dental Mechanics Certificate Course (annual intake six students)
 Diploma in Operation Theatre and Anaesthesia Technology (annual intake 15 students) 
 Diploma in Endoscopy Technology (annual intake four students) 
 Diploma in Neurotechnology
 Diploma in Optometry

Timeline 
 1905 Ophthalmic hospital opened
 1950 Medical-college foundation stone laid
 1951 First batch of MBBS students admitted
 1952 Opening of SAT Hospital and men's hostel
 1954 Opening of 450-bed medical-college hospital
 1958 Cancer wing opened
 1959 Dental college opened with BDS course, first postgraduate course, nurses hostel
 1964 Artificial Limb Centre opened
 1967 B Pharm course, comprehensive rehabilitation research and training project began
 1970 Mental and ophthalmic hospitals join the college
 1972 BScN course, SCTMC, Department of Physical Medicine and Rehabilitation commissioned
 1973 New nursing-college wing
 1975 College of Pharmaceutical Sciences opened, foundation stone for the Regional Limb Fitting Centre laid
 1976 Teacher-training programme began
 1978 New Regional Limb Fitting Centre building
 1995 Clinical Epidemiology Resource and Training Center
 1996 Dr. C.O. Karunakaran Auditorium opened
 2002 Learning Resource Centre (LRC)
 2010 BSc Optometry course (India's second government optometry school)
 2011 Specialty and outpatient wings
 2011 MSc in Medical Laboratory Technology course, specializing in pathology, microbiology or biochemistry
 2012 First cadaver organ transplant in a Kerala government hospital
 2013 First test-tube baby in a South Indian government hospital
 2015 Skywalk connecting new outpatient and ward wings
 2018 New multispecialty block (MSB) with state of the art Trauma Care ICU, Geriatric Dept and Ward, Critical care ICU, Cardiology ICU

Achievements 
 The college follows the Kerala model of health care. The state has maintained health indices at par with developed nations, well above the national averages. This has been studied by a number of agencies for use in other states of India and developing nations. During the 1950s Asian flu pandemic, it was the principal institute to isolate and research the virus.

It was ranked 21st in an India Today survey. The college has a good clinical record, but has been lagging in research. It is higher up in the NIRF ranking compared to other medical Colleges in Kerala. 

SAT Mix, developed by doctors and nutritionists at SAT Hospital, is used throughout India to manage childhood malnutrition and is a cost-effective measure to reduce infant mortality. The Thiruvananthapuram Development Chart, a scale to assess child development, was developed by the Child Development Center and is recommended for community developmental assessment. The college is one of 15 across India to be connected through the National Knowledge Commission's National Knowledge Network to integrate its knowledge base with the global scientific community.

Erudite Conclave 
The college conducted an international Erudite Conclave, the region's first, in November 2011 to provide momentum to medical research. Speakers included Nobel laureate in medicine Rolf M. Zinkernagel, ophthalmologist and inventor of inexpensive intraocular lenses Sanduk Ruit, and SRISTI and techpedia.in founder Anil Kumar Gupta. The second conclave, in 2012, was attended by R. Basant, Padmasree Dr. G. Vijayaraghavan, S. Murti (Indian Institute of Science Education and Research, Thiruvananthapuram), R. V. G. Menon and former Indian ambassador T. P. Sreenivasan.

Student life and activities 
The number of male and female students in the college is almost equal. In addition to Kerala, students from Lakshadweep, Northeast India and other parts of the country are admitted by recommendation and under the All India quota. The college hosts exchange students from the Karolinska Institute and other public-health and medical schools. Visitors have included Alexander Fleming, E. Lundsgaard, Karl Evang, Julian Huxley, Wharton Young, Jean Aicardi, David Morley and A. Lakshmana Swamy Mudaliar.

College union 
The college union was dedicated in 1952 by Alexander Fleming. Since it is in the state capital, it has been politicized and depoliticized. In accordance with Lyngdoh Committee recommendations, each incoming class selects a representative to the student council (which selects the union).

Events 
Athletic Association Day and the college-union inauguration are major campus events. The college has hosted the Kerala University Youth Festival and the Intermedicos Festival several times. Medex public exhibitions were organised in 1974 (as a part of the college's silver-jubilee celebration), 2000, 2001, 2012 and 2017. Annual cultural events (organised by the classes) and sports and games competitions are held on campus. Academic programs include the Erudite Conclave and the Student Medical Research Conference. Intermedicos Genesis 14 was held at the school on 2–8 December 2014. During the annual Interbatch Euphoria, students from different batches compete in the fields of arts, cultural activities, quizzes and sports.

Graduation 
The medical, dental, optometry and nursing colleges organize separate graduation ceremonies. There are no separate graduation ceremonies after postgraduate courses.

Notable alumni and faculty 

 C. O. Karunakaran, Special Officer and the first Principal of the Medical College, often referred to as the father of Medical College, Trivandrum. A Rockfeller Foundation Scholarship recipient, he developed smallpox and rabies vaccine indigenously in the Public Health Laboratory of Thiruvananthapuram.
 R. Kesavan Nair, Kerala's first civil surgeon and FRCS, one of the founding fathers of Trivandrum Medical College, was also its first Superintendent.
 K. V. Krishna Das, Best outgoing student of first batch with four gold medals, former Director & Professor of Medicine, Chief-Editor of many textbooks and a farmer & philanthropist. A recipient of the lifetime achievement awards of Government of Kerala, Association of Physicians of India  and Indian Society of Hematology & Blood Transfusion. Served as Member Governing Board AIIMS, Overseas Counselor Royal College of Physicians UK and  Council Member NAMS. Research areas include iron-deficiency Anemia, neoplasms of blood  and infectious diseases. One among the expert committee which published public health policy and drug formulary of Kerala. Five of his students have been honored with Padma Shri. 
 M. S. Valiathan, former director of Sree Chitra Tirunal Institute for Medical Sciences and Technology and vice-chancellor of Manipal University in Karnataka. A recipient of the Padma Bhushan and the Indian National Science Academy's Shree Dhanwantari Prize, the cardio-thoracic surgeon has published a number of papers on endomyocardial fibrosis.
 Axel Höjer, the college's second dean, was a Swedish physician from the Karolinska Institute and director-general of the Swedish Medical Board. He revolutionised community medicine in Europe with education on maternal assistance, infant disease control and sexual-hygiene courses.
 Jimmy George, Indian volleyball player and a medical student, helped the University of Kerala win the Inter-University Championships from 1973 to 1976. George later joined the Kerala Police. 
A. Marthanda Pillai, former H.O.D of the Department of Neurosurgery, recipient of Padma Shri in 2011 and founder, managing director of Ananthapuri Hospitals and Research Institute.
 M. Krishnan Nair, oncologist and founding member of the Regional Cancer Centre, Thiruvananthapuram, is the only Indian member of the World Health Organization's Advisory Committee of the Director General and Cancer Technical Group (CTG).
 P. K. R. Warrier, Cardio-thoracic surgeon established the college's department of cardio-thoracic surgery in 1964.
 M. R. Rajagopal, a palliative care physician and founder chairman of Pallium India, is a recipient of Padma Shree and is regarded as the father of palliative care in India.
 G. Vijayaraghavan, Cardiologist recipient of the Padma Shri, is the founding director of the Kerala Institute of Medical Sciences and popularized 2D echocardiography in India during the 1980s.
 B. Ekbal, former Vice Chancellor, University of Kerala (2000–2004)
 Benjamin Pulimood, Gastroenterology pioneer who is the former director of Christian Medical College, Vellore, and has represented Kerala in Santosh Trophy competition.
 K. S. Manoj, member of the Lok Sabha from Alappuzha.
 K. N. Raghavan, Former international cricket umpire and former First Secretary of the Indian High Commission at Singapore, is a civil servant at the Indian Revenue Service.
 M. Subhadra Nair, Former head of the college's department of obstetrics and gynecology who received the Padma Shri in 2014.
Mohammed Illias Sahadulla is the founding chairman and managing director of KIMS Healthcare Management and a developer of healthcare facilities in Kerala.
 Sajeev Koshy, Specialist Endodontist and recipient of the Australian Honours in 2016 and former Federal Secretary of Australian and New Zealand Academy of Endodontists.
 Sheila Balakrishnan, an author of several textbooks in Obstetrics and Gynaecology is currently a faculty here and heads the Infertility clinic.
 Sriram Venkitaraman, IAS

See also 
 List of medical colleges in India
 Jawaharlal Institute of Postgraduate Medical Education and Research
 Postgraduate Institute of Medical Education and Research
 Government T D Medical College, Alappuzha
 Christian Medical College & Hospital
 Government Medical College, Thrissur

References 

7.https://www.thehindu.com/news/national/kerala/kerala-journalist-death-sriram-venkitaraman-suspended-by-kerala-government/article28823944.ece

External links 

 Official website
 Government Dental College
 New Indian Express story
 https://www.deccanchronicle.com/nation/current-affairs/260519/neurosurgery-genesis.html

1951 establishments in India
Thiruvananthapuram
Educational institutions established in 1951
Hospitals established in 1951
Hospitals in Thiruvananthapuram
Medical colleges in Thiruvananthapuram